The Conferences of American States, commonly referred to as the Pan-American Conferences, were meetings of the Pan-American Union, an international organization for cooperation on trade. James G. Blaine, a United States politician, Secretary of State and presidential contender, first proposed establishment of closer ties between the United States and its southern neighbors and proposed international conference. Blaine hoped that ties between the United States and its southern counterparts would open Latin American markets to US trade.

History 
On 2 December 1823, President James Monroe delivered the 'Monroe Doctrine' which would eventually influence Secretary of State James G. Blaine to push for the creation of the Pan-American Conferences. In this speech, President Monroe stated that any further attempts by the Europeans to colonize the Americas (North, Central and South) would be seen as an act of aggression and would risk intervention by the United States. This doctrine was set in place in order to ensure that the colonies that were currently in place (and independent) would remain that way and to ensure that the Americas would be able to remain independent of each other and yet bond each other together at the same time. This unofficial union of the countries that comprised North, Central and South America would allow for relationships to slowly develop between the countries.

In an attempt to solidify the idea of the "Western Hemisphere", Secretary of State James. G. Blaine determined that if the United States were to be the country that put forward the idea of a Union of the Americas, the United States would hold the upper hand and would be able to guide the agenda as well as carry heavy weight in major decision-makings. Another reason for this union was for the United States to be financially benefited from the other countries – this is an aspect that the other countries soon realized, and through the conferences, attempted to prevent this from occurring.

However, when President Garfield was assassinated, Blaine was removed from his post and the process for creating the Pan-American Conference was slowed down. Eventually, through the lobbying of Congress, Blaine was able to schedule the first Pan- American Conference in January 1889.

Pan-Americanism 
First used in the New York Evening Post in 1888, the term "Pan-Americanism" was coined.  Pan-Americanism refers to the movement toward commercial, social, economic, military, and political cooperation among the nations of North, Central, and South America. The term was largely used the following year at the First International Conference of American States in Washington D.C. 1889-90.

List of Pan-American Conferences
International summits have been held in the following cities:

International Conferences of American States

Special conferences on peace and security
December 1–23, 1936: Inter-American Conference for the Maintenance of Peace (Buenos Aires)
February 21 – March 8, 1945: Inter-American Conference on Problems of War and Peace (Mexico City)
August 15 – September 2, 1947: Inter-American Conference for the Maintenance of Continental Peace and Security (Rio de Janeiro)

Meetings of foreign ministers
September 23 – October 3, 1939: First Meeting of the Foreign Ministers of the American Republics (Panama City)
July 21–30, 1940: Second Meeting of the Foreign Ministers of the American Republics (Havana)
January 15–28, 1942: Third Meeting of the Foreign Ministers of the American Republics (Rio de Janeiro)

Previous conferences
Pan-American Conferences trace their origins back to earlier Pan-American summits. The four Latin American Conferences took place prior to the Pan-American Conferences but were highly influential in the campaign to create the Pan-American Union. They are as follows:

Congress of Panama on June 22, 1826 in Panama City 
Initiated by general Simon Bolivar (a Venezuelan political and military leader), the first Latin American Conference took place in Panama. Bolivar wanted to unite all of Latin America together in order to prevent invasion by the United States as well as other major powers at that time. The United States was permitted to send representatives, and President John Quincy Adams supported the initiative, but the United States Congress was slow to provide funding for the delegation and the U.S. representatives failed to attend the conference. Titled the Panama Congress, the countries agreed to unite, convene with each other on a regular basis and provide financial and military backing to the treaty.

The Second Latin American Conference, December 1847 – March 1, 1848 in Lima, Peru 
The Latin American Conference in Lima, Peru was in response to two threats: the fear of Spanish designs upon South America's west coast and the U.S. incursion into Mexico. Although the United States were in the middle of a war with Mexico at the time of the conference, the United States was permitted to send a representative to serve as a symbol of unity to the forces present outside of the Americas (mainly Europe).

The Third Latin American Conference in September 1856 in Santiago 
Although this conference only consisted of two meetings, it was called due to the worry that the Latin Americans had towards the United States regarding their want of more territory and this time the United States was not invited. There was an attempt at signing a Continental Treaty but it fell through due to disagreements between the delegates.

The fourth Latin American Conference in November 1864 in Lima, Peru 
Failed in its attempts to make any agreements regarding the intervention that had taken place by mostly European powers. At this time, there had been an increased amount of interaction between Latin America and the United States through the actions that the European powers took regarding the Dominican Republic, Mexico and the Chincha Islands.

See also
 Organization of American States
 Summit of the Americas

References

Bibliography
 
 
 Helleiner, Eric. Forgotten Foundations of Bretton Woods: International Development and the Making of the Postwar Order, Cornell University 2014 
Long, T. (2020). "Historical Antecedents and Post-World War II Regionalism in the Americas." World Politics.
 Vanden, H.E., Prevost, G. Politics of Latin America: The Power Game (2nd Edition), 2006.

External links

 

19th-century diplomatic conferences
20th-century diplomatic conferences
21st-century diplomatic conferences (Americas)
Conference